The Bridgewater Eagles are the athletic teams that represent Bridgewater College, located in Bridgewater, Virginia, in NCAA Division III intercollegiate sports. The Eagles compete as members of the Old Dominion Athletic Conference. Altogether, Bridgewater sponsors 21 sports: 9 for men and 11 for women plus a co-ed equestrian program.

Varsity teams

List of teams

Men's sports
 Baseball
 Basketball
 Cross Country
 Football
 Golf
 Lacrosse
 Soccer
 Tennis
 Track & Field

Women's sports
 Basketball
 Cross Country
 Field Hockey
 Golf
 Lacrosse
 Soccer
 Softball
 Swimming
 Tennis
 Track & Field
 Volleyball

Co-ed sports
 Equestrian

Individual teams

Baseball
In 2014, the Bridgewater College baseball team won the Old Dominion Athletic Conference (ODAC) tournament and finished the season in the NCAA Division III South Regional Championship. The Eagles lost to Emory University, the eventual College World Series Runner-Up. This was the first ever South Regional title appearance for the Eagles as they finished in the Sweet Sixteen and were ranked in the Top 25 in both d3baseball.com and ABCA Top 30 final polls.

Equestrian
The equestrian team has consistently been one of the top teams in the Zone 4 Region 2 of the IHSA, winning the title in 2006 and 2011,  and also winning the ODAC championship in 2007 and 2009.  In 2011, Bridgewater's first ever trip to the IHSA National Show resulted in a tie for fifth place in the team standings with the University of Kentucky. Bridgewater riders finished in the Top 10 in seven of the eight classes. The top six finishers in each class scored points for their team.

Football
In 2001, the Bridgewater College football team finished the season as national runner-up after a 30–27 loss to Mount Union in the Stagg Bowl NCAA Division III National Football Championship.

References

External links